Moschochori may refer to several places in Greece:

Moschochori, Florina, a village in the Florina regional unit.
Moschochori, Kozani, a village in the Kozani regional unit.
Moschochori, Larissa, a village in the Larissa regional unit.
Moschochori, Messenia, a village in Messenia.
Moschochori, Phthiotis, a village in Phthiotis.
Moschochori, Pieria, a village in Pieria.